Australian pop rock duo Lime Cordiale have released two studio albums, two box sets, four extended plays and thirty-two singles.

Albums

Studio albums

Box sets

Extended plays

Singles

Other charted songs

Guest appearances

Notes

References

Discographies of Australian artists
Pop music group discographies
Rock music group discographies